Julio Martínez or Martinez may refer to:

Association footballers
Julio Martínez (footballer, born 1985), Salvadoran football winger
Julio Martínez (footballer, born 1982), Paraguayan football forward
Julio Martínez (footballer, born 2000), Spanish football second striker

Other sports people
Julio Martínez (journalist) (1923–2008), Chilean sports commentator
Julio René Martínez, Guatemalan athlete
J. D. Martinez (full name Julio Daniel Martinez), American baseball outfielder
Julio Martínez (weightlifter) (born 1949), Puerto Rican weightlifter

Others
Julio Martínez (Argentine politician), Argentine politician of the Radical Civic Union (UCR)
Julio Martínez, Venezuelan revolutionary, co-founder of the Venezuelan Revolutionary Party in 1926
Julio Martinez (The Passage), fictional character

See also
Julia Martínez, actress
Júlio Martins (disambiguation)